Ongoing protests in Arizona against the overturning of Roe v. Wade include demonstrations at the State Capitol and throughout Phoenix.

Events
The protests began around 7 p.m. MST on June 24, 2022, in protest of the Supreme Court ruling on abortion.

At approximately 8:30 p.m. a group of protestors appeared outside of the Arizona Senate building chanting "We won't go back!" to occupants of the building. Demonstrators began to pound on the glass walls and doors of the building, which led to officers of the Department of Public Safety deploying tear gas to disperse the crowd.

Senate President Karen Fann called a recess at 8:40 p.m. prompting an evacuation of lawmakers and staff to the basement when protestors began banging on the buildings windows and doors.

References

2022 in Arizona
2022 protests
Abortion in the United States
Events in Phoenix, Arizona
June 2022 events in the United States
Riots and civil disorder in Arizona